Jakob Gottlieb Ferdinand Heine (9 March 1809, in Halberstadt – 28 March 1894) was a German ornithologist and collector.

Heine had one of the largest private collection of birds in the mid-19th century. The collection now housed at the Heineanum Halberstadt Museum in Halberstadt (27,000 specimens, 15,000 books). Jean Cabanis wrote about the collection in Museum Heineanum. Verzeichniss der ornithologischen Sammlung des Oberamtmann Ferdinand Heine, auf Gut St. Burchard vor Halberstadt (4 volumes, 1850–63). His son Ferdinand Heine (1840-1920) was also an ornithologist.

Eponymy 
 Calandrella heinei; Homeyer, 1873.
 Clytorhynchus vitiensis heinei; Finsch & Hartlaub, 1870.
 Tangara heinei (Black-capped tanager) Cabanis, 1850.
 Zoothera heinei (Russet-tailed thrush) Cabanis, 1850.

References

External links 
 Musei Heineani Ornithologici

1809 births
1894 deaths
People from Halberstadt
German ornithologists
People from the Province of Saxony